Jessie Louise Henry Weltz (June 14, 1911 – February 17, 1967) was an American film actress who worked in Hollywood during the 1930s.

Early years
Henry was the daughter of Dr. Jesse Strauss Heiman, a physician, and his wife, a stage actress named Louise Henry Heiman. Her father was a Syracuse N.Y. native and practiced medicine there until he moved the family to New York City in 1916. Between 1914 and 1916, Louise and her family lived at 1027 Genesee Street in Syracuse, N.Y. 

By the age of 14 in 1926, Louise was engaged in dancing events throughout Europe and under contract for making movies in Berlin.

Death
On February 17, 1967, Henry died of cancer in New York City, at the age of 55.

Some sources erroneously give other accounts of Henry's death. Obituaries in the Performing Arts, 2011 says, "Actress Louise Henry ... died in Syracuse, New York, on December 12, 2011." The Mammoth Book of Best New Horror 23 also gives December 12, 2011, as the date of her death. In contrast, the third edition of Resting Places: The Burial Sites of More Than 14,000 Famous Persons says, "Internet stories that she lived to 100 in Syracuse notwithstanding, she was married to Samuel Robert Weltz until her death in New York City from Cancer at 55." A source for such confusion may be that Louise Henry's uncle, Dr. Mark Heiman, lived all of his life with his sister (also Louise's aunt) and her family in the Meadowbrook neighborhood of Syracuse. Louise is buried at Woodlawn Cemetery in The Bronx, New York.

Filmography

References

External links

1911 births
1967 deaths
20th-century American actresses
Actresses from New York (state)
American film actresses